The XIX Games of the Small States of Europe may refer to:
2021 Games of the Small States of Europe, a sporting event which would have been the XIX Games but was cancelled due to the COVID-19 pandemic.
2023 Games of the Small States of Europe, an upcoming sporting event which is scheduled to be the XIX Games